Ghatak may refer to:

 Ghatak (surname), including a list of people with the name
 Ghatak: Lethal, a 1996 Bollywood movie
 Ghatak Force, special-operations infantry platoons in the Indian Army
 Ghatak, in mythology, the last chief of the Danava dynasty before the advent of the Naraka dynasty
 Ghatak (aircraft), an Indian unmanned combat air vehicle
 Ghatak, an aerospace engine made by Gas Turbine Research Establishment in India